David Noble may refer to:
David A. Noble (1802–1876), U.S. Representative from Michigan
David F. Noble (1945–2010), historian of technology
David L. Noble, engineer at IBM who invented the floppy disk
David W. Noble (1925–2018), historiographer and historian of thought
David Noble (Australian footballer) (born 1967), former coach of North Melbourne and former Fitzroy AFL player
David Noble (canyoner) (born 1965), canyoner and discoverer of the Wollemi Pine
David Noble (footballer, born 1982), football player for St. Albans City F.C.
Dave Noble (1900–1983), American football running back